Amphimedon paraviridis is a species of sponge in the family Niphatidae, first described by Jane Fromont in 1993, from a specimen collected at a depth of 7 m, in Geoffrey Bay, Magnetic Island, in the Great Barrier Reef.

Distribution & Habitat 
It is found from Lizard Island to the Whitsundays on the Great Barrier Reef, in shallow water in lagoons or reef flats at depths of 3-4 m, firmly attached to hard substrata.

References

Haplosclerina
Taxa described in 1993
Taxa named by Jane Fromont